Abispa is a genus of large Australasian potter wasps belonging to the subfamily Eumeninae.

Species
Abispa australiana
Abispa ephippium, the "Australian hornet"
Abispa eximia
Abispa laticincta
Abispa ruficornis
Abispa splendida

References

Biological pest control wasps
Hymenoptera of Australia
Potter wasps